This is a list of MPs elected to the House of Commons at the 1826 United Kingdom general election, arranged by constituency. The Parliament was summoned 3 June 1826, assembled 25 July 1826 (prorogued until 14 November) and dissolved 24 July 1830. Initially, the Prime Minister was the leader of the Tories, the Earl of Liverpool.



Notes

References

 The History of Parliament British

See also
1826 United Kingdom general election
List of United Kingdom by-elections (1818–1832)
List of parliaments of the United Kingdom

1826 United Kingdom general election
1826
 List
UK MPs